Kanbawza Football Club is a Burmese football club, based in Taunggyi, Myanmar. Based out of Yangon until 2009, the club was the Myanmar Premier League champions in 2007, and participated in the AFC President's Cup 2008 tournament. Kanbawza FC was a founding member of the Myanmar National League in 2009, and represents the Shan State. It finished fourth in the league's inaugural cup competition, the Myanmar National League Cup 2009.

Sponsorship

Club

Coaching staff
{|class="wikitable"
|-
!Position
!Staff
|-
|Manager|| Soe Myat Min
|-
|rowspan="4"|Assistant Manager|| U Thein Tun Thein
|-
| U Than Like
|-
| U Aung Tun Tun
|-
| U Hum Tun
|-
|Goalkeeper Coach||
|-
|Fitness Coach||
|-

Other information

|-

First team squad

References

External links
 Kanbawza FC in Burmese
 First Eleven Journal in Burmese
 Soccer Myanmar in Burmese

Kanbawza